A total lunar eclipse took place on Tuesday, July 6, 1982, the second of three total lunar eclipses in 1982, and the only one that was in the descending node. A dramatic total eclipse lasting 1 hour and 46 minutes plunged the full Moon into deep darkness, as it passed right through the centre of the Earth's umbral shadow. While the visual effect of a total eclipse is variable, the Moon may have been stained a deep orange or red colour at maximum eclipse. This was a great spectacle for everyone who saw it. The partial eclipse lasted for 3 hours and 56 minutes in total.

The moon passed through the center of the Earth's shadow.

Visibility 
It was seen completely over North and South America, seen rising over Australia, and setting over Western Africa.

Related eclipses

Eclipses in 1982 
 A total lunar eclipse on January 9.
 A partial solar eclipse on January 25.
 A partial solar eclipse on June 21.
 A total lunar eclipse on July 6.
 A partial solar eclipse on July 20.
 A partial solar eclipse on December 15.
 A total lunar eclipse on December 30.
There are seven eclipses in 1982, the maximum possible, including 4 partial solar eclipses: January 25, July 20, June 21, and December 15.

Lunar year series

Saros series 

It last occurred on June 25, 1964 and will next occur on July 16, 2000.

This is the 36th member of Lunar Saros 129. The previous event was the June 1964 lunar eclipse. The next event is the July 2000 lunar eclipse. Lunar Saros 129 contains 11 total lunar eclipses between 1910 and 2090. Solar Saros 136 interleaves with this lunar saros with an event occurring every 9 years 5 days alternating between each saros series.

Inex series

Half-Saros cycle
A lunar eclipse will be preceded and followed by solar eclipses by 9 years and 5.5 days (a half saros). This lunar eclipse is related to two total solar eclipses of Solar Saros 136.

See also 
List of lunar eclipses
List of 20th-century lunar eclipses

Notes

External links 
 NASA: Lunar Eclipses: Past and Future
 
 Index to Five Millennium Catalog of Lunar Eclipses, -1999 to +3000 (2000 BCE to 3000 CE)
 Eclipses: 1901 to 2000
 Total Lunar Eclipse of 1982 July 06 Photo Gallery
 Photo mideclipse
 Vulcan Eclipse End of Totality July 6, 1982, by Jerry Lodriguss

References 
 Bao-Lin Liu, Canon of Lunar Eclipses 1500 B.C.-A.D. 3000, 1992

1982-07
1982-07
1982 in science
July 1982 events